is the greatest hits album by Japanese group Greeeen, released on November 25, 2009. There is a limited edition of the album, Super Dest!? Box, which has the bonus Compact Disc NG Dest!?.

Imamade no A Men, B Men Desuto!? debuted at No. 1 on Oricon weekly charts. The album received Triple Platinum certification from the Recording Industry Association of Japan (RIAJ) for its shipment of 750,000 copies.

Track listing

Disc One: A Men Dest
Michi (道, Road)
High G.K Low (HIGH G.K LOW〜ハジケロ〜)
Ai Uta (愛唄, Love Song)
Hito (人, Human)
Be Free
Namidazora (涙空, Teary Sky)
Tabidachi (旅立ち, Departure)
Kiseki (キセキ, Miracle)
Tobira (扉, Door)
Fuyu no Aru Hi no Uta (冬のある日の唄, The Song of A Day in Winter)
Ayumi (歩み, Walk)
Setsuna (刹那, Moment)
Haruka (遥か, Far and Away)

Disc Two: B Men Dest
Kizuna (絆, Bond)
Dream
Unity
Machi (街, Town)
Tōzainanboku (東西南北, North, South, East and West)
Rookies (ルーキーズ)
Kimiomoi (君想い, Thinking of You)
Shōnen ga yue no Jonetsu (少年が故の情熱, Ebullience because of being A Boy)
Anokoro Kara (あの頃から, From That Day)
Ameagari (アメアガリ, After the Rain)
Koe (声, Voice)

Charts

References 

2009 compilation albums
Greeeen albums